The 1992 Vuelta a Murcia was the eighth edition of the Vuelta a Murcia cycle race and was held on 10 March to 15 March 1992. The race started in Molina de Segura and finished in Murcia. The race was won by Alvaro Mejia.

General classification

References

1992
1992 in road cycling
1992 in Spanish sport